Star City Mall is a shopping center located in Jayang-dong, Seoul, South Korea. The October 2008 completion of the center was noted as being the main cause of increase in traffic on Seoul Subway Line 2 during the first half of 2009.

References

External links 
 Star City - Official Website

Shopping malls in South Korea
Buildings and structures in Seoul
Gwangjin District
Shopping malls established in 2008